Leeds Equity Partners is a private equity firm focused on investments in the Knowledge Industries.  The firm is investing its fifth private equity fund, Leeds Equity Partners V, L.P., the largest fund focused exclusively on investing in this sector.  The firm's investors include a broad range of leading institutions, public and private pension plans, endowments, foundations, financial institutions, family offices and high-net-worth individuals.

History
The firm was founded in 1993 by Jeffrey T. Leeds and Robert A. Bernstein and raised its first private equity fund in 1995.

In 2017, the company relocated their New York office from 350 Park Avenue between East 51st and East 52nd Streets to the 41st floor at 590 Madison Avenue, a building that adjoins Trump Tower.

References

External links

Leeds Equity Partners (company website)

Private equity firms of the United States
Companies based in New York City
Financial services companies established in 1993